Bernadette Menu (born 1942) is a French archaeologist and Egyptologist, whose research work on ancient Egypt is widely known. She is mother of the writer Jean-Christophe Menu.

Career 
Her illustrated pocket book about Ramesses II, from the collection “Découvertes Gallimard”, has been translated into eight languages, including English.

Publications 
 Le régime juridique des terres et du personnel attaché à la terre dans le Papyrus Wilbour, Publications de la faculté des lettres et sciences humaines, N° XVII, Institut de papyrologie et d’égyptologie, 1970
 L’Obélisque de la Concorde, Éditions du Lunx, 1987
 Ramsès II : Souverain des souverains, collection « Découvertes Gallimard » (nº 344), série Histoire. Éditions Gallimard, 1998
 US edition – Ramesses II: Greatest of the Pharaohs, “Abrams Discoveries” series. Harry N. Abrams, 1999
 UK edition – Ramesses the Great: Warrior and Builder, ‘New Horizons’ series. Thames & Hudson, 1999
 Vivre en Égypte ancienne, collection « Découvertes Gallimard Texto » (nº 1). Éditions Gallimard, 1998
 Exercices corrigés de la petite grammaire de l’égyptien hiéroglyphique à l’usage des débutants, Librairie orientaliste Paul Geuthner, 1998
 Recherches sur l’histoire juridique, économique et sociale de l’ancienne Égypte. II, Institut français d’archéologie orientale, 1998
 Égypte pharaonique : Nouvelles recherches sur l’histoire juridique, économique et sociale de l’ancienne Égypte, collection « Droit et cultures » (nº 4). Éditions L’Harmattan, 2004

References 

1942 births
20th-century French archaeologists
21st-century French archaeologists
French Egyptologists
French women archaeologists
French National Centre for Scientific Research scientists
Living people